The Coeur d'Alene River flows  from the Silver Valley into Lake Coeur d'Alene in the U.S. state of Idaho. The stream continues out of Lake Coeur d'Alene as the Spokane River.

Before the Bunker Hill Smelter in the Kellogg area, which mined lead and silver, was forced to adopt environmental controls in the 1970s, there was so much lead in the river in the Kellogg area the locals called the stream "Lead Creek."

Salmon levels continue to remain high in the area, and it is a popular destination for water-skiing, tubing, and swimming for locals.

All of the real bodies of water in the film Dante's Peak were either the Coeur d'Alene River or one of its tributaries, as Wallace, Idaho, where the movie was filmed, is in the Silver Valley.

Environmental concerns have come from upstream hard rock mining and smelting operations in the Silver Valley. The majority of the lake bed is covered in a layer of contaminated sediment and local health officials at the Panhandle Health District advise the lake's visitors to wash anything that has come into contact with potentially lead-laced soil or dust in the Coeur d'Alene River basin.

See also
List of tributaries of the Columbia River
List of rivers of Idaho

References

External links

Rivers of Idaho
Rivers of Shoshone County, Idaho
Idaho Panhandle National Forest
Coeur d'Alene, Idaho